Friesland is a province of the Netherlands.

Friesland may also refer to:

Geography
In Europe
 Frisia, a coastal North Sea region extending from the Netherlands to the German–Danish border region
 East Frisia (East Friesland), an area of northern Germany, in Lower Saxony
 Friesland (district), 1933–1977, 1980–ongoing: a Landkreis in the German state of Lower Saxony
 Lordship of Friesland, historical region, 1524–1795. 
 Friesland Department, 1802–1810, Batavian Republic
 Frise (department), 1811–1814, French Empire
 Frisland, a mythical island in the 16th century and 17th century

Outside Europe
 Friesland, Paraguay, a village (mennonite colony) in Paraguay
 Friesland, Wisconsin, a village in south central Wisconsin
 Friesland, Minnesota, an unincorporated community in east central Minnesota
 Vriesland, Michigan, a village in Michigan settled by Frisian immigrants
 Friesland Ridge, a ridge in Tangra Mountains, Livingston Island, Antarctica;
 Mount Friesland, in the Friesland Ridge, Tangra Mountains, Livingston Island, Antarctica

Military
 The German Air Force Regiment "Friesland"
 Friesland class destroyer
 HNLMS Friesland, several ships of the Dutch navy

Other
 Friesland School

See also
 Frisia (disambiguation)
 West Friesland (disambiguation)